Harry Milton Levy House is a registered historic building in Cincinnati, Ohio, listed in the National Register on January 30, 1998.

Historic uses 
Single Dwelling

Notes

External links
National Register nomination form

National Register of Historic Places in Cincinnati
Houses in Cincinnati
Houses on the National Register of Historic Places in Ohio